Maz Abd Ali-ye Pain (also Romanized as Māz ‘Abd ‘Alī-ye Pā’īn; also known as Māz ‘Abd ol ‘Alī-ye Pā’īn) is a village in Anaran Rural District, in the Central District of Dehloran County, Ilam Province, Iran. At the 2006 census, its population was 214, in 38 families. The village is populated by Lurs.

References 

Populated places in Dehloran County
Luri settlements in Ilam Province